Sean Thomas Mannion (born April 25, 1992) is an American football quarterback who is a free agent. He played college football at Oregon State and was their starting quarterback from 2011 to 2014. He was drafted by the St. Louis Rams in the third round of the 2015 NFL Draft.

High school career
Born in San Jose, California, Mannion attended Foothill High School in Pleasanton, California. Not only did Mannion play football, but he also played on the baseball varsity team as a pitcher in his junior and senior year and he also played on the junior varsity basketball team, but quit to better pursue baseball and football. As a senior, he played in 12 games and threw for 3,521 yards and 27 touchdowns, in his first year as the starter for the Varsity high school football team. He came out of high school as a three-star recruit according to ESPN. On February 3, 2010, he signed with Oregon State, turning down offers from San Diego State, San Jose State, UCLA, and Washington State.

College career
Mannion was redshirted as a freshman in 2010. As a redshirt freshman in 2011, he started 10 out of 12 games. He finished the season completing 305 of 473 passes for 3,328 yards, 16 touchdowns, and 18 interceptions.

During his sophomore season in 2012, Mannion completed 200 of 309 passes for 2,446 yards, 15 touchdowns, and 13 interceptions.

Mannion remained the starter in 2013. On September 21, 2013, Mannion threw for five touchdown passes against the Utah Utes, tying a school record held by Derek Anderson. The next game, On September 28, Mannion threw for six touchdown passes against the Colorado Buffaloes, setting a new school record for most passing touchdowns in a game. Mannion finished the 2013 season leading the Beavers to a 7–6 record, including a victory in the Hawaii Bowl over the Boise State Broncos on Christmas Eve. In the final game, Mannion threw for 259 yards, giving him a Pac-12-record, 4,662 yards passing for the season. He finished the season with a school-record 37 passing touchdowns.

Remaining the starter his senior season in 2014, Mannion became the Beavers all-time leader in career passing yards and passing touchdowns during the season, passing Derek Anderson's records. Later in the year, he became the Pac-12's all-time leader in passing yards, breaking Matt Barkley's record. He finished the season with 3,164 yards and 15 touchdowns.

For his career, Mannion started 43 games, completing 1,187 of 1,838 passes for 13,600 yards, 83 touchdowns and 54 interceptions.

Collegiate statistics

Professional career

Mannion was rated as the sixth best quarterback in the 2015 NFL Draft by NFLDraftScout.com.

St. Louis / Los Angeles Rams
Mannion was selected by the St. Louis Rams in the third round, 89th overall, of the 2015 NFL Draft. He started his career as the third-string quarterback behind Case Keenum and Nick Foles in his rookie year in 2015.

2015 season
Mannion played in his first NFL game of his career during a Week 12 matchup against the Cincinnati Bengals in which the Rams lost 31–7. He was put in the game late in the fourth quarter, in relief of Nick Foles. He completed 6 passes out of 7 attempts for 31 yards, posting an 85.1 passer (QB) rating.

2016 season
Mannion started 2016 as the second-string backup quarterback behind starter Case Keenum and ahead of the first overall pick of the 2016 NFL Draft, Jared Goff. In the season-opening 28–0 loss against the San Francisco 49ers, Goff took over as the second-string quarterback, demoting Mannion back as the third-string backup quarterback. Mannion was promoted to second-string for the final two weeks of the season. In Week 17, on New Year's Day, Mannion completed 3 of 6 passes for 19 yards and an interception after starter Jared Goff was subbed out of the game in a 44–6 blowout loss to the Arizona Cardinals.

2017 season
Mannion started the 2017 season as the backup to Goff after Keenum went to the Minnesota Vikings during free agency. In the season opener against the Indianapolis Colts, Mannion came into the game to finish up in relief of Goff after the Rams were up 46–9 and again in Week 15 when they were up 42–7 over the Seattle Seahawks. Due to head coach Sean McVay resting most of his starters for the playoffs and having the playoff seed locked in, Mannion started the regular season finale against the San Francisco 49ers. Mannion was 20-of-34 for 169 yards with no touchdowns or interceptions in the 34–13 loss.

2018 season
With Goff remaining as the starter, Mannion appeared in three games in relief roles in the 2018 season. The Rams reached Super Bowl LIII, but lost 13–3 to the New England Patriots.

Minnesota Vikings
On April 7, 2019, Mannion signed with the Minnesota Vikings. Mannion made his debut with the Vikings in Week 17 against the Chicago Bears as a result of the Vikings resting their starters with a playoff berth already clinched. During the game, Mannion threw for 126 yards and two interceptions in the 21–19 loss.

On March 19, 2020, Mannion re-signed with the Vikings. He didn't appear in a game in 2020 as the backup to Kirk Cousins.

Seattle Seahawks
On July 31, 2021, Mannion signed with the Seattle Seahawks. He was released on September 1, 2021.

Minnesota Vikings (second stint)
On September 2, 2021, Mannion signed with the Minnesota Vikings practice squad. On September 21, 2021, Mannion was promoted to the active roster. When Vikings starter Kirk Cousins tested positive for COVID-19, Mannion was named as the starting quarterback for the team's Week 17 game at the Green Bay Packers. In the game, Mannion threw his first career touchdown pass to K.J. Osborn for 14 yards.

On March 22, 2022, Mannion re-signed with the Vikings.

Mannion was released by the Vikings on August 30, 2022.

Seattle Seahawks (second stint)
On September 1, 2022, Mannion was signed to the Seattle Seahawks practice squad.  His practice squad contract with the team expired after the season on January 14, 2023.

NFL career statistics

See also
 List of Division I FBS passing yardage leaders

References

External links
 Minnesota Vikings bio
 Oregon State Beavers bio

1992 births
Living people
American football quarterbacks
Los Angeles Rams players
Minnesota Vikings players
Oregon State Beavers football players
People from Pleasanton, California
Players of American football from San Jose, California
Seattle Seahawks players
Sportspeople from Alameda County, California
St. Louis Rams players